Joanneum Research Forschungsgesellschaft mbH is one of the largest non-academic research institutes in Austria. Besides its headquarters in Graz it is also based in Weiz, Hartberg, Niklasdorf, Klagenfurt and Vienna. 85 percent of the company are owned by the province of Styria, the remaining 15 percent are held by the province of Carinthia.

References

Government-owned companies of Austria
Research institutes in Austria
Styria
Medical and health organisations based in Austria
Organisations based in Graz